The Archaeological Museum of Chios is a museum located on Michalon Street  in Chios town, Chios, Greece. It was constructed in 1966-1971 and covers a total area of 2500 square metres. 1200 square metres of floor space is occupied by the exhibitions.

The museum underwent renovation in 1998 and reopened in November 1999 and features a collection of antiquities from the Neolithic Era up to the Roman times excavated at the ancient sites of Emporio, Fana, Dotia, Aghio Galas and at Chios town. Many of the artifacts unearthed at the sites were dug by the British School of Archaeology.

The periodical exhibition is housed on the third floor and is named “Psara in Antiquity”.  It contains artifacts such as vases,  gold jewelry, terracotta figurines and funeral gift items. The Psara collection was found at the Mycenaean Necropolis of Archontiki on Psara Island.

References

External links
Hellenic Ministry of Culture and Tourism / in Greek

Chios
Buildings and structures in Chios